Arthur Plotnik (1937 - August 28, 2020) was a photographer, journalist, author and librarian, known for being the editor of American Libraries magazine for fifteen years. Plotnik worked for the American Library Association for over twenty years. His photographs covering 23 years of librarians and librarianship are held at the American Library Association Archives.

Before working at ALA, Plotnik worked at the Library of Congress and was a staff writer and reviewer at Albany’s Times-Union. Two of his books The Elements of Editing and The Elements of Expression: Putting Thoughts into Words were Book of the Month Club selections.

Early life
Plotnik was born in 1937 to Annabelle and Mike Plotnik, the son of Russian immigrants. Plotnik graduated from White Plains High School in 1955; he was voted "wittiest" in his class. He earned his BA at Harpur College, and earned his master's degree in English at the University of Iowa where he studied under Philip Roth.

Works and Publications
 Aaron Schmink's first crazy love (2018)  
 Better than great : a plenitudinous compendium of wallopingly fresh superlatives (2013, with Richard Waterhouse)  
 The Elements of Expression : Putting Thoughts into Words (2012, with Jessica Morell)  
 Spunk & bite : a writer's guide to bold, contemporary style (2005)  
 Elements of authorship : from lonely honk to roar of the crowd (2000)  
 The urban tree book : an uncommon field guide for city and town (2000)  
 Honk if you're a writer : unabashed advice, undiluted experience, and unadulterated inspiration for writers and writers-to-be (1992)  
 Man Behind the Quill, Jacob Shallus (1987)  
 The Elements of Editing: A Modern Guide for Editors and Journalists (1982)  
 Library Life--American Style: A Journalist's Field Report (1975)

References

External links
 Official site

2020 deaths
1937 births
American librarians